Roger Hunt (1938–2021) was an English footballer.

Roger Hunt may also refer to:
 Roger L. Hunt (born 1942), U.S. federal judge
 Hal and Roger Hunt, characters in Willard Price's "Adventure" series
 Roger Hunt (speaker) (died 1450s), Speaker of the House of Commons
 Ernie Hunt (born 1943), footballer born Roger Hunt, and whose clubs included Swindon Town and Coventry City
 Roger W. Hunt (1938–2018), American politician and lawyer